Koreans in Africa form a very small population, estimated at only 9,200 people in 2005, with almost half of these living in South Africa. South Korean nationals can be found in 49 countries of Africa, including the continent and its surrounding islands; they have established schools in 19 of those countries. They form a small part of the Korean diaspora.

History

South Africa considered importing labourers from Korea as early as 1903 in order to control rising mining wages, but eventually decided on Chinese workers instead.

North Koreans
In the past, North Korea  ran several military and civil assistance programmes to some of Africa's more radical states, including Guinea, Ethiopia, Zimbabwe, Mali and Tanzania. In return, North Korea was able to gain diplomatic recognition and other leverage; they were successful in ensuring South Korea was unable to join the Non-Aligned Movement. In Egypt's case the relationship was especially close; North Korean pilots flew Egyptian fighters in the 1973 Yom Kippur War and Egypt exported to North Korea scud missiles.  Egypt even had diplomatic relations established with Israel before it had relations with South Korea.

North Korea was also involved in several armed insurgency movements in Angola, Rhodesia and in the Seychelles, and provided support to the African National Congress and South West Africa People's Organization (SWAPO). In 1984, 3,000 North Korean military advisers were dispatched to Angola, and later were reportedly engaged in combat operations with the People's Armed Forces for the Liberation of Angola (FAPLA). Around the same time there were some North Koreans in Lesotho involved in training for the Youth League of the Basotho National Party's Vincent Makhele faction, but they were expelled due to pressure from South Africa in early 1986.

In the 1990s and beyond, as governments in Africa became more pragmatic and South Korea's economic position became clearly superior to that of the North's, North Korea's influence in Africa declined.

South Koreans
During the wave of Korean labour migration to the Arab world in the 1970s and 1980s, many Koreans went to Arab countries of North Africa, including Libya, and to a lesser extent, Egypt and Sudan. Though Libya did not receive its first South Korean workers until 1977, it was the only Arab country which experienced consistent growth in the number of Korean workers between 1981 and 1985. By 1985 it had already become the Arab world's second most popular destination, with 23,138 arrivals from South Korea. In total, from 1977 until 1985, 103,953 South Koreans went to Libya. The Korean community in Nigeria consists of 550 construction engineers from South Korean construction companies Daewoo and Hyundai Heavy Industries, 240 local residents, and 10 missionaries sent by Christian churches in South Korea.  There is also a small population of roughly 200 Koreans in Botswana, largely formed by employees of South Korean automobile manufacturers; 154 live in the capital Gaborone. In late 2008, there were media reports that roughly 30 or 40 immigration brokers in Seoul's Gangnam-gu were helping South Korean parents to obtain permanent residency in Mali and other African countries so that they could enroll their children in international schools at home.

Education 
The Cairo Korean School, founded on 5 December 1979 is Africa's only Korean day school and the earliest registered Korean educational institution of any kind in Africa; it enrolled 84 elementary school students and 119 middle school students . Weekend Korean language schools for South Korean nationals have been established in eighteen other African countries as well, enrolling a total of 640 students. These are listed below (ordered by date of founding of the earliest school):

See also
Asian Africans
Asian South Africans

References

Notes

Sources

 

 
Overseas Korean groups